You're Always on My Mind may refer to:

 You're Always On My Mind (Barbara Jones album), a 1984 album by Jamaican singer Barbara Jones
 You're Always on My Mind (A Great Big Pile of Leaves album), a 2013 album by American band A Great Big Pile of Leaves
 "You're Always on My Mind", a 1972 song by American band Gallery
 "You're Always on My Mind", a song written by J. W. Alexander, published in 1961 on Sam Cooke's album My Kind of Blues
 "You're Always on My Mind", a song from It's About Time (SWV album), 1992

See also
 Always on My Mind (disambiguation)